Emilio Barahona (born 15 April 1949) is a Honduran middle-distance runner. He competed in the men's 1500 metres at the 1968 Summer Olympics.

References

1949 births
Living people
Athletes (track and field) at the 1968 Summer Olympics
Honduran male middle-distance runners
Olympic athletes of Honduras
Place of birth missing (living people)